The fifteenth series of British reality television series The Apprentice (UK) was broadcast in the UK on BBC One, from 2 October to 18 December 2019. As with the previous series, the first task was conducted abroad, with the candidates travelling further afield than had been previously staged in the programme's history of business-related tasks held in other countries. In addition, the sister programme The Apprentice - You're Fired saw a change in the host before the series broadcast, with comedian Tom Allen overseeing interviews with candidates after their final appearance within this series. Alongside the standard twelve episodes, the series was preceded by the mini online episode "Meet the Candidates" on 24 September, with two specials aired alongside the series – "The Final Five" on 10 December, and "Why I Fired Them" on 18 December.

Sixteen candidates took part in the fifteenth series, with Carina Lepore becoming the overall winner. Excluding the specials, the series averaged around 7.17 million viewers during its broadcast.

Series Overview 
Applications for the fifteenth series began in late November 2018, towards the end of the fourteenth series, with applicants assessed and interviewed by production staff between January and February 2019. Filming took place during Spring to early Summer that year, once the final line-up of sixteen participants had been finalised, with final editing completed before the programme's premiere episode was broadcast in mid-Autumn. The series maintained the changes to the format introduced in the previous series, though filming for the series involved travelling abroad to South Africa, the most distant place used for a production site in the programme's history. Both teams adopted names in the third task upon each having mixed genders, with the names Empower and Unison used for the rest of the contest. Of those who took part, Carina Lepore would become the eventual winner, going on to use her prize to set up an artisan bakehouse chain of retail units.

Candidates

Performance chart

Key:
 The candidate won this series of The Apprentice.
 The candidate was the runner-up.
 The candidate won as project manager on his/her team, for this task.
 The candidate lost as project manager on his/her team, for this task.
 The candidate was on the winning team for this task / they passed the Interviews stage.
 The candidate was on the losing team for this task.
 The candidate was brought to the final boardroom for this task.
 The candidate was fired in this task.
 The candidate lost as project manager for this task and was fired.

Episodes

<onlyinclude>

Controversy 
"Gandhi" comments

Following the broadcast of the second episode, a WhatsApp group used by the candidates to stay in contact was shut down. The action by producers was claimed by Kenna Ngoma, in an interview with Digital Spy, to be in response to a leaked message from the group made by Lottie Lion, in which she referenced Lubna Farhan as Gandhi. Her message led to several complaints against the programme over racism. However, Lion denied these were true and stated that her words had been "misinterpreted" and "taken out of context". The programme's staff gave no comment to the allegations, but did forward the matter to the BBC, who made clear that the behaviour of candidates who appear on the programme must be appropriate during and after filming, deeming that the comments by Lion on WhatsApp had been "wholly unacceptable" regardless of her excuse. After an investigation into further complaints by other candidates and her actions, both the BBC and the production staff made the decision to not have her appear in the final two episodes of You're Fired, after deciding her comments had been "unacceptable" on WhatsApp.

Ratings
Official episode viewing figures are from BARB and includes viewers on all devices.

References

External links
Official site BBC

15
2019 British television seasons